The battle of Katasyrtai (Kατασυρται) occurred in the fall of 917, shortly after the striking Bulgarian triumph at Achelous near the village of the same name close to the Byzantine capital Constantinople, (now Istanbul). The result was a Bulgarian victory.

Origins of the conflict 

From the beginning of 917 both sides prepared for decisive actions. The Byzantines tried to forge a coalition against Bulgaria but their attempts failed due to the fast reaction of the Bulgarian ruler Simeon I. Nonetheless, the Byzantines gathered an enormous army, but they were decisively defeated at Achelous.

The battle 

While the victorious Bulgarian army was marching southwards, the Byzantine commander Leo Phokas, who survived at Achelous, reached Constantinople by sea and gathered the last Byzantine troops to intercept his enemy before reaching the capital. The two armies clashed near the village of Katasyrtai just outside the city and after a night fight, the Byzantines were completely routed from the battlefield.

Aftermath 

The last Byzantine military forces were literally destroyed and the way to Constantinople was opened, but the Serbs rebelled to the west and the Bulgarians decided to secure their rear before the final assault of the Byzantine capital which gave the enemy precious time to recover.

Citations

References 
 
 

910s conflicts
917
10th century in Bulgaria
910s in the Byzantine Empire
Battles involving the First Bulgarian Empire
Battles of the Byzantine–Bulgarian Wars in Thrace
Night battles